The Firebag River is a river in northern Alberta and Saskatchewan, Canada. It gets its name from the traditional bags Aboriginals once used to carry fire-starting flints.
Firebag River in western Canada
It originates in Firebag Lake in northwestern Saskatchewan, flows west into Alberta, and discharges in the Athabasca River 65 km north of Fort McKay.

The length of the river is approximately 170 km, and the average discharge at the Athabasca River confluence is 20 m³/s.

The southern tract of Marguerite River Wildland protects part of the river valley, and a recreation park for Northeast Alberta Region located along the river has been proposed in 1980

Suncor has an SAGD project in production (the Firebag in-situ operation), extracting bitumen from the oil sands of the McMurray Formation located in the river basin.

Fort MacKay/Firebag Aerodrome is located 22 nautical miles (41 km; 25 mi) away.

See also 
 List of rivers of Alberta
 List of rivers of Saskatchewan

References 

Rivers of Alberta
Rivers of Saskatchewan